De Modderige Bol is a Hollow Post mill in Goëngahuizen, Friesland, Netherlands which has been restored to working order. The mill is listed as a Rijksmonument, number 34001.

History
The date that De Modderige Bol was built is unknown. The earliest record is its appearance on a map dated 1848. The mill was restored in 1954 and 1969. A further restoration was undertaken in 1978 by millwrights Bouwbedrijf Van Zuiden of Tjerkwerd. On 9 November 1978, the mill was sold to Stichting De Fryske Mole. The mill was restored again in 1992–93.

Description

De Modderige Bol is what the Dutch describe as an spinnenkop -. It is a hollow post mill on a single storey square roundhouse. The mill is winded by tailpole and winch. The roundhouse is clad in pantiles and mill body is covered in vertical boards, while the roof of the mill is boarded and covered in felt. The sails are Common sails. The sails are carried on a wooden  windshaft. The windshaft also carries the brake wheel which has 43 cogs. This drives the wallower (21 cogs) at  the top of the upright shaft. At the bottom of the upright shaft, the crown wheel, which has 31 cogs drives a gearwheel with 30 cogs on the axle of the Archimedes' screw. The axle of the Archimedes' screw is 250 millimetres (9¾ inches) diameter. It is inclined at 24°. Each revolution of the screw lifts  of water.

Public access
De Modderige Bol is open by appointment.

References

Buildings and structures completed in the 19th century
Windmills in Friesland
Hollow post mills in the Netherlands
Windpumps in the Netherlands
Rijksmonuments in Friesland